Roger Kastel (born  1932) is an American artist, most famous for creating the poster for the film Jaws. His other work has included the poster for The Empire Strikes Back.

A native of White Plains, New York, Kastel would commute to Manhattan to attend classes at the Art Students League.  He currently lives in Milford, Massachusetts.

References

External links

 
 
Real Hollywood Thriller: Who Stole Jaws?

1932 births
Living people
People from White Plains, New York
American male artists